Columbus is an unincorporated community located within Mansfield Township in Burlington County, New Jersey, United States. The area is served as United States Postal Service ZIP Code 08022. Most of Mansfield Township's governmental offices are located in and around Columbus. It is also the main business district in the township with many businesses lining the main roads in the area. It is located at the junction of County Route 543 (which passes east and west through the area) and U.S. Route 206 (US 206) which is a major highway that heads north and south. US 206 originally passed through the center of Columbus on Atlantic Avenue and New York Avenue until it was moved to a short four-lane bypass of downtown in the late 1950s/early 1960s. The old surface route became state-maintained New Jersey Route 170 but became a county-maintained road (Burlington CR 690) in 1986.

As of the 2010 United States Census, the population of ZIP Code Tabulation Area 08022 was 8,783.

History
The area had been settled in the 18th century and featured a tavern named Black Horse Tavern. The community was originally known as Black Horse after the tavern, a vote was held in 1795 to determine Burlington County's county seat which featured Black Horse as one of three top vote-getters. Black Horse and the City of Burlington narrowly lost to Mount Holly. The settlement was renamed Columbus around 1827 in honor of Christopher Columbus.

Notable people

People who were born in, residents of, or otherwise closely associated with Columbus include:
 Rosey Brown (1932-2004), offensive tackle who played in the NFL for the New York Giants and was inducted into the Pro Football Hall of Fame.
 Cedric Jackson (born 1986), professional basketball player.

The Columbus Farmer's Market

The Columbus Farmer's Market is located at 2919 Route 206 in Springfield township, New Jersey. The Columbus Farmer's Market is the largest and oldest farmer's market in the Delaware Valley. Opening in 1919, the market originally served as  an auction for farm animals such as cattle and horses. The original location of the Columbus Farmer's Market was in the center of Columbus. However, in 1929 the market relocated to its current location on Route 206. The market continued to grow at its new location, selling not only livestock but a variety of agricultural machinery and fresh eggs. In 1988 the Columbus Farmer's Market was sold to a new owner, who expanded the market to 200 acres. Under the new ownership, the Columbus Market introduced a new produce building, the outdoor flea market and a multitude of other developments. The Columbus Farmers Market now has expanded to four new buildings, which contain the Columbus Self Storage, The Columbus Antiques Mall and J&L Sheds and Furniture. In present day, the market serves the community in a multitude of ways, selling flowers, fresh produce and fish, baked good and other foods, clothing, jewelry and an assortment of other merchandise available at the outdoor and indoor markets.

References

External links

Regional map
Columbus Farmers Market

Mansfield Township, Burlington County, New Jersey
Unincorporated communities in Burlington County, New Jersey
Unincorporated communities in New Jersey